Paretroplus is a genus of fishes in the cichlid family, all of which are endemic to lakes and rivers of Madagascar. The vast majority are threatened and restricted to the northwestern part of the island. Only P. polyactis is found in the southern half of Madagascar and only P. polyactis and P. gymnopreopercularis are found in eastern drainages. Most are restricted to freshwater, but at least P. polyactis and P. maromandia can also be seen in brackish habitats.

They are more closely related to the genus Etroplus from India and Sri Lanka than they are to other cichlids from Madagascar (subfamilies Paratilapiinae and Ptychochrominae). Paretroplus includes both relatively slender-bodied species (P. damii, P. gymnopreopercularis, P. kieneri, P. lamenabe, P. loisellei, P. nourissati and P. tsimoly) and relatively deep-bodied species (all remaining).

Species
There are currently 13 recognized species in this genus. Additionally, an undescribed species from the P. damii–loisellei species group is known from the Ankofia River basin in northwestern Madagascar.

 Paretroplus dambabe Sparks, 2002
 Paretroplus damii Bleeker, 1868
 Paretroplus gymnopreopercularis Sparks, 2008
 Paretroplus kieneri Arnoult, 1960
 Paretroplus lamenabe Sparks, 2008 (Big red cichlid)
 Paretroplus loisellei Sparks & Schelly, 2011
 Paretroplus maculatus Kiener & Maugé, 1966
 Paretroplus maromandia Sparks & Reinthal, 1999
 Paretroplus menarambo Allgayer, 1996
 Paretroplus nourissati (Allgayer, 1998)
 Paretroplus petiti Pellegrin, 1929
 Paretroplus polyactis Bleeker, 1878
 Paretroplus tsimoly Stiassny, Chakrabarty & Loiselle, 2001

The genus can be divided into several clades, and one of these includes P. lamenabe, P. nourissati and P. tsimoly, which have been considered worthy of placement in their own genus Lamena (still used in their common names). On a higher level these three are part of a clade that also includes P. damii and P. loisellei.

References

 
Etroplinae
Cichlid fish of Africa

Freshwater fish genera
Cichlid genera
Taxa named by Pieter Bleeker
Taxonomy articles created by Polbot